The Tavt mine is a gold mines in the Teshig sum of Bulgan aimag in northern Mongolia.

The mine consists of strips that have gold-silver-copper ingredient. The reserves are estimated to a total of about 7.2 t of Gold and more than 25 t of silver. The yearly capacity is about 350 kg of gold.

References 

Gold mines in Mongolia